Nagmeldin Ali Abubakr (born February 22, 1986) is a Sudanese athlete who mainly competes in the 400 metres. He was born in Khartoum.

His current personal best time is 44.93 seconds, achieved in April 2005 in Mecca.

Ali competed in the 400 metres event at the 2008 Summer Olympics in Beijing failing to advance to the semifinals.

He lives in Nyala, southern Darfur, and is a sergeant in the Sudanese army. His family is of the Zaghawa (Beri) ethnic group.

Achievements

References

External links
 
 "Nagmeldin Ali Abubakr", n°58 on Time’s list of "100 Olympic Athletes To Watch"

1986 births
Living people
Sudanese male sprinters
Athletes (track and field) at the 2004 Summer Olympics
Athletes (track and field) at the 2008 Summer Olympics
Olympic athletes of Sudan
World Athletics Championships athletes for Sudan
African Games silver medalists for Sudan
African Games medalists in athletics (track and field)
Athletes (track and field) at the 2003 All-Africa Games
Athletes (track and field) at the 2007 All-Africa Games
Islamic Solidarity Games competitors for Sudan
Islamic Solidarity Games medalists in athletics